Compendium Maleficarum is a witch-hunter's manual written in Latin by Francesco Maria Guazzo, and published in Milan (present-day Italy) in 1608.

It discusses witches' pacts with the devil, and detailed descriptions of witches’ powers and poisons. It also contains Guazzo's classification of demons, based on a previous work by Michael Psellus.

Translations
The book was not translated into English until 1929, when this was accomplished under the direction of the eccentric witchcraft scholar Montague Summers.

References

External links 
 
 
 Compendium Maleficarum—Online version of Latin text and scanned pages of Compendium Maleficarum published in 1626.

1608 books
17th-century Latin books
Witch hunter manuals
Witchcraft treatises
Witchcraft in Italy